The Bleecker Street station was a station on the demolished IRT Sixth Avenue Line in Manhattan, New York City. It had two tracks and two side platforms. It was served by trains from the IRT Sixth Avenue Line and opened on June 5, 1878.  It closed on December 4, 1938.

See also
Bleecker Street/Broadway–Lafayette Street (New York City Subway)

References

IRT Sixth Avenue Line stations
Railway stations in the United States opened in 1878
Railway stations closed in 1938
Former elevated and subway stations in Manhattan
1878 establishments in New York (state)
1938 disestablishments in New York (state)

Sixth Avenue